Laika (– 3 November 1957) was a Soviet space dog who was one of the first animals in space and the first to orbit the Earth. A stray mongrel from the streets of Moscow, she flew aboard the Sputnik 2 spacecraft, launched into low orbit on 3 November 1957. As the technology to de-orbit had not yet been developed, Laika's survival was never expected. She died of overheating hours into the flight, on the craft's fourth orbit.

Little was known about the impact of spaceflight on living creatures at the time of Laika's mission, and animal flights were viewed by engineers as a necessary precursor to human missions. The experiment, which monitored Laika's vital signs, aimed to prove that a living organism could survive being launched into orbit and continue to function under conditions of weakened gravity and increased radiation, providing scientists with some of the first data on the biological effects of spaceflight.

Laika died within hours from overheating, possibly caused by a failure of the central R7 sustainer to separate from the payload. The true cause and time of her death were not made public until 2002; instead, it was widely reported that she died when her oxygen ran out on day six or, as the Soviet government initially claimed, she was euthanised prior to oxygen depletion. In 2008, a small monument to Laika depicting her standing atop a rocket was unveiled near the military research facility in Moscow that prepared her flight. She also appears on the Monument to the Conquerors of Space in Moscow.

Sputnik 2

After the success of Sputnik 1 in October 1957, Nikita Khrushchev, the Soviet leader, wanted a spacecraft launched on 7 November 1957, the fortieth anniversary of the October Revolution. Construction had already started on a more sophisticated satellite, but it would not be ready until December; this satellite would later become Sputnik 3.

Meeting the November deadline meant building a new craft. Khrushchev specifically wanted his engineers to deliver a "space spectacular", a mission that would repeat the triumph of Sputnik1, stunning the world with Soviet prowess. Planners settled on an orbital flight with a dog. Soviet rocket engineers had long intended a canine orbit before attempting human spaceflight; since 1951, they had lofted twelve dogs into sub-orbital space on ballistic flights, working gradually toward an orbital mission set for some time in 1958. To satisfy Khrushchev's demands, they expedited the orbital canine flight for the November launch.

According to Russian sources, the official decision to launch Sputnik2 was made on 10 or 12 October, leaving less than four weeks to design and build the spacecraft. Sputnik2, therefore, was something of a rush job, with most elements of the spacecraft being constructed from rough sketches. Aside from the primary mission of sending a living passenger into space, Sputnik2 also contained instrumentation for measuring solar irradiance and cosmic rays.

The craft was equipped with a life-support system consisting of an oxygen generator and devices to avoid oxygen poisoning and to absorb carbon dioxide. A fan, designed to activate whenever the cabin temperature exceeded , was added to keep the dog cool. Enough food (in a gelatinous form) was provided for a seven-day flight, and the dog was fitted with a bag to collect waste. A harness was designed to be fitted to the dog, and there were chains to restrict her movements to standing, sitting, or lying down; there was no room to turn around in the cabin. An electrocardiogram monitored heart rate and further instrumentation tracked respiration rate, maximum arterial pressure, and the dog's movements.

Training
Laika was found as a stray wandering the streets of Moscow a week before the launch. Soviet scientists chose to use Moscow strays since they assumed that such animals had already learned to endure conditions of extreme cold and hunger. She was a  mongrel female, approximately three years old. Soviet personnel gave her several names and nicknames, among them Kudryavka (Russian for Little Curly), Zhuchka (Little Bug), and Limonchik (Little Lemon). Laika, the Russian name for several breeds of dogs similar to the husky, was the name popularised around the world. Its literal translation would be "Barker", from the Russian verb "layat" (лаять), "to bark". According to some accounts, the technicians actually renamed her from Kudryavka to Laika due to her loud barking. The American press dubbed her Muttnik (mutt + suffix -nik) as a pun on Sputnik, or referred to her as Curly. Her true pedigree is unknown, although it is generally accepted that she was part husky or other Nordic breed, and possibly part terrier. NASA refers to Laika as a "part-Samoyed terrier." A Russian magazine described her temperament as phlegmatic, saying that she did not quarrel with other dogs.

The Soviet Union and United States had previously sent animals only on sub-orbital flights. Three dogs were trained for the Sputnik2 flight: Albina, Mushka, and Laika. Soviet space-life scientists Vladimir Yazdovsky and Oleg Gazenko trained the dogs.

To adapt the dogs to the confines of the tiny cabin of Sputnik2, they were kept in progressively smaller cages for periods of up to twenty days. The extensive close confinement caused them to stop urinating or defecating, made them restless, and caused their general condition to deteriorate. Laxatives did not improve their condition, and the researchers found that only long periods of training proved effective. The dogs were placed in centrifuges that simulated the acceleration of a rocket launch and were placed in machines that simulated the noises of the spacecraft. The dogs were trained to eat a special high-nutrition gel that would be their food in space.

Before the launch one of the mission scientists took Laika home to play with his children. In a book chronicling the story of Soviet space medicine, Dr. Vladimir Yazdovsky wrote, "Laika was quiet and charming... I wanted to do something nice for her: She had so little time left to live."

Preflight preparations
Yazdovsky made the final selection of dogs and their designated roles. Laika was to be the "flight dog"a sacrifice to science on a one-way mission to space. Albina, who had already flown twice on a high-altitude test rocket, was to act as Laika's backup. The third dog, Mushka, was a "control dog"she was to stay on the ground and be used to test instrumentation and life support.

Before leaving for the Baikonur Cosmodrome, Yazdovsky and Gazenko conducted surgery on the dogs, routing the cables from the transmitters to the sensors that would measure breathing, pulse, and blood pressure.

Because the existing airstrip at Turatam near the cosmodrome was small, the dogs and crew had to be first flown aboard a Tu104 plane to Tashkent. From there, a smaller and lighter Il14 plane took them to Turatam. Training of dogs continued upon arrival; one after another they were placed in the capsules to get familiar with the feeding system.

According to a NASA document, Laika was placed in the capsule of the satellite on 31 October 1957three days before the start of the mission. At that time of year, the temperatures at the launch site were extremely low, and a hose connected to a heater was used to keep her container warm. Two assistants were assigned to keep a constant watch on Laika before launch. Just prior to liftoff on 3 November 1957, from Baikonur Cosmodrome, Laika's fur was sponged in a weak ethanol solution and carefully groomed, while iodine was painted onto the areas where sensors would be placed to monitor her bodily functions.

One of the technicians preparing the capsule before final liftoff: "After placing Laika in the container and before closing the hatch, we kissed her nose and wished her bon voyage, knowing that she would not survive the flight."

Voyage
Accounts of the time of launch vary from source to source, given as 05:30:42 Moscow Time or 07:22 Moscow Time.

At peak acceleration, Laika's respiration increased to between three and four times the pre-launch rate. The sensors showed her heart rate was 103 beats/min before launch and increased to 240 beats/min during the early acceleration. After reaching orbit, Sputnik2's nose cone was jettisoned successfully; however, the "Block A" core did not separate as planned, preventing the thermal control system from operating correctly. After three hours of weightlessness, Laika's pulse rate had settled back to 102 beats/min, three times longer than it had taken during earlier ground tests, an indication of the stress she was under. The early telemetry indicated that Laika was agitated but eating her food. After approximately five to seven hours into the flight, no further signs of life were received from the spacecraft.

The Soviet scientists had planned to euthanise Laika with a serving of poisoned food. For many years, the Soviet Union gave conflicting statements that she had died either from asphyxia, when the batteries failed, or that she had been euthanised. Many rumours circulated about the exact manner of her death. In 1999, several Russian sources reported that Laika had died when the cabin overheated on the fourth orbit. In October 2002, Dimitri Malashenkov, one of the scientists behind the Sputnik2 mission, revealed that Laika had died by the fourth circuit of flight from overheating. According to a paper he presented to the World Space Congress in Houston, Texas, "It turned out that it was practically impossible to create a reliable temperature control system in such limited time constraints."

Over five months later, after 2,570 orbits, Sputnik2 (including Laika's remains) disintegrated during re-entry on 14 April 1958.

Ethics of animal testing

Due to the overshadowing issue of the Soviet–U.S. Space Race, the ethical issues raised by this experiment went largely unaddressed for some time. As newspaper clippings from 1957 show, the press was initially focused on reporting the political perspective, while Laika's health and retrievalor lack thereofonly became an issue later.

Sputnik 2 was not designed to be retrievable, and it had always been accepted that Laika would die. The mission sparked a debate across the globe on the mistreatment of animals and animal testing in general to advance science. In the United Kingdom, the National Canine Defence League called on all dog owners to observe a minute's silence on each day Laika remained in space, while the Royal Society for the Prevention of Cruelty to Animals (RSPCA) received protests even before Radio Moscow had finished announcing the launch. Animal rights groups at the time called on members of the public to protest at Soviet embassies. Others demonstrated outside the United Nations in New York. Laboratory researchers in the U.S. offered some support for the Soviets, at least before the news of Laika's death.

In the Soviet Union, there was less controversy. Neither the media, books in the following years, nor the public openly questioned the decision to send a dog into space. In 1998, after the collapse of the Soviet regime, Oleg Gazenko, one of the scientists responsible for sending Laika into space, expressed regret for allowing her to die:

In other Warsaw Pact countries, open criticism of the Soviet space program was difficult because of political censorship, but there were notable cases of criticism in Polish scientific circles. A Polish scientific periodical, "Kto, Kiedy, Dlaczego" ("Who, When, Why"), published in 1958, discussed the mission of Sputnik2. In the periodical's section dedicated to astronautics, Krzysztof Boruń described the Sputnik2 mission as "regrettable" and criticised not bringing Laika back to Earth alive as "undoubtedly a great loss for science".

Legacy

Laika is memorialised in the form of a statue and plaque at Star City, the Russian Cosmonaut training facility. Created in 1997, Laika is positioned behind the cosmonauts with her ears erect. The Monument to the Conquerors of Space in Moscow, constructed in 1964, also includes Laika. On 11 April 2008 at the military research facility where staff had been responsible for readying Laika for the flight, officials unveiled a monument of her poised on top of a space rocket. Stamps and envelopes picturing Laika were produced, as well as branded cigarettes and matches.

Future space missions carrying dogs would be designed to be recovered; the first successful recovery followed the flight of Korabl-Sputnik 2, wherein the dogs Belka and Strelka, alongside dozens of other organisms, safely returned to Earth. Nonetheless, four other dogs later died in Soviet space missions: Bars and Lisichka were killed when their R7 rocket exploded shortly after launch on 28 July 1960, while Pchyolka and Mushka died when Korabl-Sputnik 3 suffered an emergency and had to be detonated.

In popular culture
Although never shown, Laika is prominently mentioned in the 1985 film My Life as a Dog, in which the main character (a young Swedish boy in the late 1950s) identifies strongly with the dog.
Laika, a 2007 graphic novel by Nick Abadzis giving a fictionalized account of Laika's life, won the 2008 Eisner Award for Best Publication for Teens.
Laika is mentioned in the 1986 song "Laika" by Mecano from album "Entre el cielo y el suelo", and in the 2004 song "Neighborhood #2 (Laika)" by Arcade Fire, included on their debut album Funeral.
Laika inspired the creation of the Marvel character Cosmo the Spacedog, who subsequently appeared in several comic books and films.
Lajka (in English: Laika) is a 2017 Czech animated science fiction comedy film inspired by Laika.
Laika Studios, a stop-motion animation studio, was named after Laika.

See also
Laika (cigarette)
Animals in space
Albert II, first mammal in space
Félicette, first cat in space
Belka and Strelka
Soviet space dogs
List of individual dogs
Transportation of animals

References

Citations

Bibliography

 SP-2000-4408. Part 1 (page 1-500), Part 2 (page 501-1011).

Further reading
Angliss, Sarah and Uttley, Colin. Science in the Dock: The man who trained the space dogs. Retrieved 28 January 2005.
Dubbs, Chris and Burgess, Colin. Animals In Space: From Research Rockets to the Space Shuttle, 2007.

External links

History of Sputnik Missions
Sputnik 2 at Astronautix

1954 animal births
1957 animal deaths
1957 in spaceflight
Sputnik
Animals in space
Individual dogs
Deaths in space
1957 in the Soviet Union
Deaths from hyperthermia
Dog training and behavior
Animal testing in the Soviet Union
Dogs in human culture